Nicholas Sinclair (born 1954) is a British portrait and landscape photographer.  His work has been published in a number of books of his own, exhibited eight times at the National Portrait Gallery in London, and is held in the permanent collections there and in the Victoria and Albert Museum, London.  In 2003 he was made a Hasselblad Master.

Life and work
Sinclair was born in London. He studied fine art at Newcastle University.

His career as a photographer began in 1982 with a series of photographs taken in the circus which were first exhibited in 1983 at the University of Sussex and subsequently published in the British Journal of Photography.

He is known principally as a portrait photographer, his subjects include Anthony Caro, Frank Auerbach, John Piper and Paula Rego. He has edited two books about the Welsh artist Kyffin Williams and made portraits of him.

Sinclair also makes landscape photographs—he has made two books on European cities and one on a lake.

Publications

Publications by Sinclair
The Chameleon Body. London: Lund Humphries, 1996. . With essays by David Alan Mellor and Anthony Shelton.
Franko B. London: Black Dog, 1998. . With essays by Stuart Morgan and Lois Keidan.
Portraits of Artists. London: Lund Humphries, 2000. . With an essay by Ian Jeffrey, and a conversation between Sinclair and Robin Dance.
Crossing the Water. Brighton: Photoworks, 2002. . With an essay by David Alan Mellor and an afterword by Ian Jeffrey.
Berlin: Imagining the Tri Chord. London: Royal Academy of Arts, 2007. . With an essay by David Chandler.
Five Cities. London: Royal Academy of Arts, 2010. . With an essay by Nicky Hamlyn.

Publications edited by Sinclair
John Holloway Downlandscapes. Self-published, 2004. .
Kyffin Williams. London: Lund Humphries, 2004. .
The Art of Kyffin Williams. London: Royal Academy of Arts, 2007. .

Awards
2003: Hasselblad Masters Award

Exhibitions

Solo exhibitions
1983: Gardner Arts Centre, University of Sussex, Brighton
2014: Pallant House Gallery, Chichester

Other exhibitions
His work has been exhibited eight times at the National Portrait Gallery, London

Collections

Sinclair's work is held in the following permanent collections:
National Portrait Gallery, London
Solomon R. Guggenheim Foundation, Venice, Italy.
Victoria and Albert Museum, London

References

External links

1954 births
Living people
Alumni of Newcastle University
Photographers from London
British portrait photographers